Enewetak Atoll (also spelled Eniwetok Atoll or sometimes Eniewetok; , , or , ; known to the Japanese as Brown Atoll or Brown Island) is a large coral atoll of 40 islands in the Pacific Ocean and with its 296 people (as of 2021) forms a legislative district of the Ralik Chain of the Marshall Islands.

It was held by the Japanese from 1914 until its capture by the United States in February 1944, during World War II, then became Naval Base Eniwetok.  Nuclear testing by the US totaling the equivalent of over 30 megatons of TNT took place during the Cold War; in 1977–1980, a concrete dome (the Runit Dome) was built on Runit Island to deposit radioactive soil and debris.

The Runit Dome is deteriorating and could be breached by a typhoon, though the sediments in the lagoon are even more radioactive than those which are contained.

Etymology 
The U.S. government referred to the atoll as "Eniwetok" until 1974, when it changed its official spelling to "Enewetak" (along with many other Marshall Islands place names, to more properly reflect their pronunciation by the Marshall Islanders).

Geography
Enewetak Atoll formed atop a seamount. The seamount was formed in the late Cretaceous. It is made of basalt, and its depth is due to a general subsidence of the entire region and not because of erosion.

History
Humans have inhabited the atoll since about 1,000 B.C.

The islands were first settled by Austronesian islanders.

The first European colonizers to Enewetak, Spanish explorer Álvaro de Saavedra Cerón, arrived on 10 October 1529. He called the island "Los Jardines" (The Gardens). In 1794, sailors aboard the British merchant sloop Walpole called the islands "Brown's Range" (thus, the Japanese name "Brown Atoll"). It was visited by about a dozen ships before the establishment of the German colony of the Marshall Islands in 1885. With the rest of the Marshalls, Enewetak was captured by the Imperial Japanese Navy in 1914, during World War I and mandated to the Empire of Japan by the League of Nations in 1920. The Japanese administered the island under the South Seas Mandate, but mostly left affairs in hands of traditional local leaders until the start of World War II. The atoll, together with other parts of Marshall Islands located to the west of 164°E, was placed under the governance of Pohnpei district during the Japanese administration period, and is different from the rest of the Marshall Islands.

In November 1942, the Japanese built an airfield on Engebi Island. As they used it only for refueling planes between Truk and islands to the east, no aviation personnel were stationed there and the island had only token defenses. When the Gilberts fell to the United States, the Imperial Japanese Army assigned defense of the atoll to the 1st Amphibious Brigade, formed from the 3rd Independent Garrison, which had previously been stationed in Manchukuo. The 1st Amphibious Brigade arrived on January 4, 1944. Some 2,586 of its 3,940 men were left to defend Eniwetok Atoll, supplemented by aviation personnel, civilian employees, and laborers. However, they were unable to finish the fortifications before the American attack came in February. During the ensuing Battle of Eniwetok, the Americans captured Enewetak in a five-day amphibious operation. Fighting mainly took place on Engebi Islet, site of the most important Japanese installation, although some combat occurred on the main islet of Enewetak itself and on Parry Island, where there was a Japanese seaplane base.

Following its capture, the anchorage at Enewetok became a major US Naval Advance Base with Service Squadron 4 and Service Squadron 10 stationed in the lagoon. The daily average of ships present during the first half of July 1944 was 488; during the second half of July, the daily average number of ships at Enewetak was 283. Naval Base Eniwetok was part of the vast Naval Base Marshall Islands. US Navy Seabees of the 110th Naval Construction Battalion arrived on February 21 and 27 to begin construction of Stickell Field.  It had two taxiways and a  runway.  In June 1945, the 67th CB arrived to build a 35,000 man recreation center to be turned over to CBMU 608.

In 1950, John C. Woods, who executed the Nazi war criminals convicted at the Nuremberg Trials, was accidentally electrocuted there.

After the end of World War II, Enewetak came under the control of the United States as part of the Trust Territory of the Pacific Islands, until the independence of the Marshall Islands in 1986. During its tenure, the United States evacuated the local residents many times, often involuntarily. The atoll was used for nuclear testing, as part of the Pacific Proving Grounds. Before testing commenced, the U.S. exhumed the bodies of United States servicemen killed in the Battle of Enewetak and returned them to the United States to be re-buried by their families. 43 nuclear tests were fired at Enewetak from 1948 to 1958.

The first hydrogen bomb test, code-named Ivy Mike, occurred in late 1952 as part of Operation Ivy; it vaporized the islet of Elugelab. This test included B-17 Flying Fortress drones to fly through the radioactive cloud to test onboard samples. B-17 mother ships controlled the drones while flying within visual distance of them. In all, 16 to 20 B-17s took part in this operation, of which half were controlling aircraft and half were drones. To examine the explosion clouds of the nuclear bombs in 1957/58, several rockets (mostly from rockoons) were launched. One USAF airman Jimmy Robinson was lost at sea during the tests. Robinson's F-84 Thunderjet crashed and sank  short of the island. Robinson's body was never recovered.

A radiological survey of Enewetak was conducted from 1972 to 1973. In 1977, the United States military began decontamination of Enewetak and other islands. The final cost of the cleanup project was US$239 million. The United States government declared the southern and western islands in the atoll safe for habitation in 1980, and residents of Enewetak returned that same year. The military members who participated in that cleanup mission are suffering from many health issues, but the U.S. Government refused to provide health coverage until 2022 with the passage of the PACT Act.

Section 177 of the 1983 Compact of Free Association between the governments of the United States and the Marshall Islands establishes a process for Marshallese to make a claim against the United States government as a result of damage and injury caused by nuclear testing. That same year, an agreement was signed to implement Section 177, which established a US$150 million trust fund. The fund was intended to generate US$18 million a year, which would be payable to claimants on an agreed-upon schedule. If the US$18 million a year generated by the fund was not enough to cover claims, the principal of the fund could be used. A Marshall Islands Nuclear Claims Tribunal was established to adjudicate claims. In 2000, the tribunal made a compensation award to the people of Enewetak consisting of US$107.8 million for environmental restoration; US$244 million in damages to cover economic losses caused by loss of access and use of the atoll; and US$34 million for hardship and suffering. In addition, as of the end of 2008, another US$96.658 million in individual damage awards were made. Only US$73.526 million of the individual claims award has been paid, however, and no new awards were made between the end of 2008 and May 2010. Due to stock market losses, payments rates that have outstripped fund income, and other issues, the fund was nearly exhausted, as of May 2010, and unable to make any additional awards or payments. A lawsuit by Marshallese arguing that "changed circumstances" made Nuclear Claims Tribunal unable to make just compensation was dismissed by the Supreme Court of the United States in April 2010.

The 2000 environmental restoration award included funds for additional cleanup of radioactivity on Enewetak. Rather than scrape the topsoil off, replace it with clean topsoil, and create another radioactive waste repository dome at some site on the atoll (a project estimated to cost US$947 million), most areas still contaminated on Enewetak were treated with potassium. Soil that could not be effectively treated for human use was removed and used as fill for a causeway connecting the two main islands of the atoll (Enewetak and Parry). The cost of the potassium decontamination project was US$103.3 million.

A report by the US Congressional Research Service projects that the majority of the atoll will be fit for human habitation by 2026–2027, after nuclear decay, de-contamination and environmental remediation efforts create sufficient dose reductions. However, in November 2017, the Australian Broadcasting Corporation reported that rising sea levels caused by climate change are seeping inside the dome, causing radioactive material to leak out.

Education
Marshall Islands Public School System operates Enewetak Elementary School. Marshall Islands High School on Majuro serves the community.

Eniwetok Airfield

Men from the 110th Naval Construction Battalion arrived on Eniwetok between 21 and 27 February 1944 and began clearing the island for construction of a bomber airfield. A  by  runway with taxiways and supporting facilities was built. The first plane landed on 11 March. By 5 April the first operational bombing mission was conducted.
The base was later named for Lieutenant John H. Stickell.

In mid-September 1944 operations at Wrigley Airfield on Engebi Island were transferred to Eniwetok.

US Navy and Marine units based at Eniwetok included:

VB-102 operating PB4Y-1s from 12–27 August 1944
VB-108 operating PB4Y-1s from 11 April-10 July 1944
VB-109 operating PB4Y-1s from 5 April-14 August 1944
VB-116 operating PB4Y-1s from 7 July-27 August 1944
VPB-121 operating PB4Y-1s from 1 March-3 July 1945
VPB-144 operating PV-2s from 27 June 1945 until September 1946

The airstrip is now abandoned and its surface partially covered by sand.

Parry Island seaplane base
The Imperial Japanese Navy had developed a seaplane base on Parry Island. Following its capture on 22 February, Seebees from the 110th Naval Construction Battalion expanded the base, building a coral-surfaced parking area and shops for minor aircraft and engine overhaul. A marine ways was installed on a Japanese pier and boat-repair shops were also erected.

US Navy and Marine units based at Parry Island included:

VP-13 operating PB2Y-3s from 26 February-22 June 1944
VP-16 operating PBM-3Ds from 7 June-1 August 1944
VP-21 operating PBM-3Ds from 19 August-17 October 1944 and from 15 July-11 September 1945
VP-23 operating PBY-5As from 20 August 1944 – 9 April 1945
VP-MS-6 operating PBM-5Es from 1 February 1948 in support of Operation Sandstone
VP-102 operating PB2Y-3s from 3 February-30 August 1944
VP-202 operating PBM-3Ds from 24 February-1 March 1944
VPB-19 operating PBM-3Ds from 2 November 1944 – 12 February 1945 and 6 March 1945-January 1946
VPB-22 operating PBM-3Ds from 10 October-30 November 1944 and from 25 June-7 August 1945

List of nuclear tests at Eniwetok

Summary

Operation Sandstone

Operation Greenhouse

Operation Ivy

Operation Castle

Operation Redwing

Operation Hardtack I

Gallery

Missile Impact Location System
From 1958 through 1960 the United States installed the Missile Impact Location System (MILS) in the Navy managed Pacific Missile Range, later the Air Force managed Western Range, to localize the splash downs of test missile nose cones. MILS was developed and installed by the same entities that had completed the first phase of the Atlantic and U.S. West Coast SOSUS systems. A MILS installation, consisting of both a target array for precision location and a broad ocean area system for good positions outside the target area, was installed at Eniwetok as part of the system supporting Intercontinental Ballistic Missile (ICBM) tests. Other Pacific MILS shore terminals were at the Marine Corps Air Station Kaneohe Bay supporting Intermediate Range Ballistic Missile (IRBM) tests with impact areas northeast of Hawaii and the other ICBM test support systems at Midway Island and Wake Island.

In popular culture

The short story "The Terminal Beach" by J. G. Ballard is set on an island of Eniwetok in the aftermath of the nuclear tests.

Notes

References

External links

 Marshall Islands site
 
 Annotated bibliography for Eniwetok Atoll from the Alsos Digital Library for Nuclear Issues
 Information on legal judgements to the people of Enewetak
 Nursing a nuclear test hangover (www.watoday.com.au report on Runit Dome, August 18, 2008)
 Enewetak Atoll Atomic Debris Cleanup Mission Survivors
 

 
Atolls of the Marshall Islands
Ralik Chain
 
American nuclear test sites
Trust Territory of the Pacific Islands
Articles containing video clips